Save the Children is an album by the American soul group the Intruders, released in 1973.

The album peaked at No. 133 on the Billboard 200.

Production
Save the Children was produced by Gamble & Huff. It was the first album to credit the Philadelphia International Records house band, MFSB. "I'll Always Love My Mama", like many Intruders' songs, includes a mid-song interruption where the group members engage in a loose rap related to the song's theme.

Critical reception

AllMusic stated that "the cream is the spirited, tear-inducing 'I'll Always Love My Mama', the best mama song ever." Pitchfork deemed the album "a deeply eccentric take on Philly soul." The Rolling Stone Album Guide wrote that the album "qualifies as one of the few consistently satisfying albums to come from the Philly factory," arguing that "disco begins here: the fleet guitar-and-horn stroke that ignites 'Mama' points the way to a new, non-rock dance groove."

Track listing

References

1973 albums